The G. V. Kurdyumov Institute for Metal Physics (IMP) of the National Academy of Sciences of Ukraine - scientific institution, the largest in Ukraine and Europe center of basic research in the field of metal physics, is one of the oldest research institutions of physical science within the Academy. It is named after Georgy Kurdyumov, a Soviet metallurgist and physicist.

Currently, the Institute employs more than 250 researchers (together with several Full Members and Corresponding Members of the NASU) and around 150 peoples of supporting personnel. It has more than 20 scientific units (including the state-of-the-art hardware) which are grouped around several research programs.

Traditionally, the Institute is focused on fundamental research. At the same time, applied research on metals, their alloys, and related nanotechnologies strengthen the Institute's activities.

The IMP is consistently ranked at the top of national academic institutions ranking. Besides, international reputation of IOP is growing constantly as prominent scientists from the Institute expand their activity to leading foreign research centers and universities.

History
History of the Kurdyumov Institute of Metal Physics of Ukraine began in 1945, when on the basis of the Department of Metal Physics of the Institute of Ferrous Metallurgy of the USSR Academy of Sciences was established Laboratory of Metal Physics of the USSR Academy of Sciences, reorganized in 1955 into the Institute of Metal Physics.

Publishings

The institute publishes scientific journals "Metal Physics and the latest technologies", "Successes of metal physics"  and a collection of scientific papers "Nanosystems, nanomaterials, nanotechnologies".

Directors
 1945 — 1951 Georgii Kurdyumov
 1951 — 1954 Vitaliy Danylov
 1955 Adrian Smirnov
 1955 — 1985 Vitaliy Gridnev
 1985 — 1989 Viktor Bariakhtar
 1989 — 2002 Volodymyr Nemoshkalenko
 2002 — 2011 Anatoliy Shpak
 2011 — 2019 Orest Ivasyshyn
 2019 —      Valentyn Tatarenko

External links

References

Science and technology in Ukraine
Scientific organizations based in Ukraine
Research institutes in the Soviet Union
Institutes of the National Academy of Sciences of Ukraine
NASU department of physics and astronomy
Research institutes in Kyiv
Physics institutes
Research institutes established in 1945
1945 establishments in the Soviet Union